Chris Biller (born October 10, 1985 in Concord, California) is an American rugby union player who currently plays for San Francisco Golden Gate RFC.

Chris began playing rugby for San Francisco Golden Gate, following his collegiate career with the California Golden Bears. He was named to the Collegiate All-Americans before his debut on the Men's National Team vs Ireland in May 2009 which he scored a try.

In November 2011 Bath Rugby signed him on a short-term contract to cover for injured players. Biller found little playing time with Bath as injured players quickly recovered. His contract expired in February 2012 and in March 2012 Biller signed a short-term contract with Northampton Saints. Biller then moved back to California to play with his former club, SFGG for the 2013 season.

References

External links
 Profile at web.usarugby.org

1985 births
Living people
American rugby union players
United States international rugby union players
Rugby union hookers